Taming a Sea-Horse is the 13th Spenser novel by Robert B. Parker.

The title is from the Robert Browning poem "My Last Duchess." The book's epigraph is of the poem's closing lines: "Nay, we'll go / Together down, sir: / Notice Neptune, though, /Taming a sea-horse thought a rarity, / Which Claus of Innsbruck cast in bronze for me!"

The story follows Boston based PI Spenser as he searches for April Kyle, the prostitute he met in events described in the earlier novel Ceremony. Kyle's story continues in Hundred-Dollar Baby.

Recurring characters
Spenser
Hawk
Patricia Utley
Dr. Susan Silverman, Ph.D
April Kyle
Frank Belson
Tony Marcus

External links
 Parker's page on the book

1986 American novels
Spenser (novel series)
Novels set in Boston
Novels set in New York City